Royal Tusk is a Canadian rock band from Edmonton, Alberta, Canada, consisting of Daniel Carriere (vocals), Quinn Cyrankiewicz (guitar) and Sandy MacKinnon (bass).

History

2011–2014: Origins and Mountain
The band formed in 2011 in Edmonton, in the shadow of Carriere and MacKinnon's previous band, Ten Second Epic. They started writing songs for their debut EP, Mountain. The EP was recorded in Edmonton in 2014, and released by Canadian independent record label Hidden Pony Records. The single Shadow of Love from the EP received airplay in local radio stations.

2015–2017: DealBreaker
After minimal touring off of the success of their EP, the band started to record their first album. DealBreaker was released on May 26, 2016. The album spawned two singles, 'Fever' and 'Curse the Weather.' Fever received music video treatment, but Curse the Weather did not.

2018–2021: Tusk II and breakthrough
In 2018, the band released their sophomore album with their new label, Entertainment One Music. Tusk II was released on October 25, 2018. The first single from the album, Aftermath, was released earlier in the month, peaked at #36 on the Billboard Mainstream Rock Charts. The music video for Aftermath was directed by Evan Owen Dennis, and was released on October 4, 2018. The album's third single,  Die Knowing's music video was directed by Keenan Kirk and was released on January 20, 2019.

2021–Present: Covid-19 Impacts

On August 26, 2021 the band announced via Instagram that due to illness they would be canceling their upcoming tour. It was revealed on April 5, 2022 that that the cancelation was due to Daniel Carriere developing severe Long COVID symptoms. The Band set up a GoFundMe to help support Daniel during his recovery.

Members

Present
Daniel Carriere – vocals, rhythm guitar (2013–present)
Quinn Cyrankiewicz – lead guitar, backing vocals (2013–present)
Sandy MacKinnon – bass, backing vocals (2013–present)

Past
Mike James – keyboards, guitars (2013–2016)
Calen Stuckel – drums (2013–2020)

Discography

Albums
Mountain (2014)
DealBreaker (2016)
Tusk II (2018)

Singles
"Shadow of Love" (2014)
"Smoke Rings" (2014)
"Fever" (2016)
"Curse the Weather" (2016)
"Aftermath" (2018)
"Reflection" (2019)
"First Time" (2019)
"Die Knowing" (2020)

Charting singles

Music videos

References

External links

Canadian heavy metal musical groups
Canadian hard rock musical groups
Entertainment One
MapleMusic Recordings artists
Musical groups from Edmonton
2011 establishments in Alberta